Eda Zoritte Megged (born 30 January 1926) is an Israeli writer, essayist, playwright, translator and poet.

Biography 
Zoritt was born in Tel Aviv in 1926. She graduated from the Levinsky Seminar for Teachers in Jaffa, studied dance and theater in the United States and appeared there in productions of the Hebrew theater "Pargod", directed by Peter Frye.

After returning to Israel, Zoritt began publishing essays about literature and art, in the literary supplement "Masa" (He: ״משא״, the literature supplement of LaMerhav newspaper), in other newspapers and in books. Among her publications are an essay on the poetry of Nathan Alterman, a partial biography of Amir Gilboa, a biography of Avoth Yeshurun and studies of his works.  She also published historical novels, including about Theodor Herzl's wife, Hayim Nahman Bialik's wife and Nathan Alterman's lover, the painter Zila Binder. In addition, she published novels, short stories and a poetry book titled "The Shadow of Time".

Zoritt is writer Aharon Megged's widow. Her children are the writer Ayal Megged and the historian Amos Megged.

Performed plays 
"Last Game" was directed by Robert Rietti and performed in Purcell Room in London in 1970.
"The Crystal Ball" was performed by the Karov Theatre in 2010.

Prizes 

1981, 2000  –  Prime Minister's Award
1990  –  Dov Sadan Foundation Award

Works

Fiction and poetry 
Ariadne's Thread (dialogue), Aleph, 1964 [Chut Ariadna]
Somber Blossoming (novel), Hakibbutz Hameuchad, 1969 [Pricha Afela]
Happy Years (novel), Sifriat Poalim, 1975 [Ha-Gil Ha-Meushar]
The Roman Way (stories), Massada [Ba-Derech Ha-Roma'it]
Astray (novel), Am Oved, 1984 [Iir Ha-Nidachat]
His Alienated Wife (novel), Keter, 1997 [Ishto Ha-Menuda] – a novel about Theodor Herzl's wife
Life Long Love (novel), Keter, 2000 [Ahavat Chayim] – a novel on the tragic love of the painter Ira Jan for Hayim Nahman Bialik
The Maiden and the Poet, Yedioth Ahronoth, 2004 [Ha-Alma Ve-Ha-Meshorer] – about Nathan Alterman's lover, the painter Zila Binder
The Thirty-Seventh Step (stories), Carmel, 2007 [Ha-Madrega Ha-Shloshim Ve-Sheva]
Aurelia: Book of Visions and Prayers (novel), Nahar Sfarim, 2012 [Aurelia: Sefer Ha-Chezyonot Ve-Ha-Tfilot]
The Shadow of Time (poetry), Olam Hadash, 2014 [Tzel Ha-Zman]

Non fiction
Two Plays of Love, Eked, 1963 [Shnei Machazot Al Ahava]
The Sacrifice and the Covenant (monograph), 1973 [Ha-Korban Ve-Ha-Brit] – studies of the poetry of Nathan Alterman
Spheres of Life and Emanation (literary essays), Hakibbutz Hameuchad, 1988 [Ha-Chayim, Ha-Atzilut]
The Song of the Noble Savage: A Biography of the Poet Avot Yeshurun, Hakibbutz Hameuchad/ Siman Kriah, Sifriat Zagagy, 1995 [Shirat Ha-Pere Ha-Atzil: Biographya Shel Ha-Meshorer Avot Yeshurun]

Translations 
"The Dragon", a play performed by the Cameri Theater in 1964.
"The Ice Palace" ("Is-slottet") by Tarjei Vesaas.

References

Israeli women essayists
Israeli female dramatists and playwrights
1926 births
Writers from Tel Aviv
20th-century Israeli women writers
21st-century Israeli women writers
20th-century Israeli poets
Israeli women poets
21st-century Israeli poets
20th-century Israeli dramatists and playwrights
21st-century dramatists and playwrights
Historical novelists
Israeli women novelists
20th-century Israeli novelists
Living people
Israeli expatriates in the United States
Translators to Hebrew
Translators from Norwegian
Israeli translators
Recipients of Prime Minister's Prize for Hebrew Literary Works